Gomphocalyx is a monotypic genus of flowering plants in the family Rubiaceae. The genus contains only one species, viz. Gomphocalyx herniarioides, which is endemic to Madagascar.

References

Spermacoceae
Monotypic Rubiaceae genera
Taxa named by John Gilbert Baker